Harry Barker Reserve is a cricket and hockey ground in Te Hapara, Gisborne, New Zealand.

Establishment
The Gisborne City Council purchased the Turanganui Golf Course in 1962, and developed it into a housing estate on the Pacific Coast Highway. The houses surround a substantial recreational area, which the council named the Harry Barker Reserve after a former mayor of Gisborne.

Cricket
The ground held its first first-class match when Northern Districts played Otago in the 1974-75 Plunket Shield.  As of late 2021 the ground has held 28 first-class matches, the most recent in January 2014.  The first List A match there was in the 1981-82 Shell Cup when Northern Districts played Wellington.  As of late 2021 the ground has held 11 List A matches, the most recent in January 2015. A three-day tour match between a New Zealand XI and a Zimbabwean team was played at the ground in January 2012.

As well as the main cricket ground there are several other pitches spread out across the reserve. The Poverty Bay Cricket Association often holds an entire senior three-match round of club cricket on the reserve simultaneously. It is the headquarters and main home ground of the Association.

Hockey
The hockey stadium with blue Polytan synthetic turf was completed in 2015. On 7 April 2015 an international match was played there between the New Zealand and Argentina women's teams. New Zealand won 1–0. It was the first time an international sporting fixture had been held in Gisborne. The two teams returned for another match the next day, when Argentina beat New Zealand 7–1.

References

External links
Harry Barker Reserve at ESPNcricinfo
Harry Barker Reserve at CricketArchive
Harry Barker Reserve at Gisborne District Council website 

Cricket grounds in New Zealand
Sport in the Gisborne District
Buildings and structures in the Gisborne District
Gisborne, New Zealand